Alexis Nikole Nelson (born May 26, 1992) is an American forager, cook, and internet personality. She maintains the TikTok account alexisnikole and Instagram page blackforager, where she posts videos of her foraging finds along with cooking techniques and historical information. She currently lives in Columbus, Ohio.

In 2022, Nelson won the inaugural James Beard Award for Best Social Media Account.

Early life and education 
Alexis Nikole Nelson was born on May 26, 1992, and grew up in Cincinnati, Ohio. Her mother first showed her how to forage at the age of five by introducing her to onion grass. She attended the New School Montessori and Walnut Hills High School, from which she graduated in 2010. She graduated from the Ohio State University in 2015 with degrees in environmental science and theatre.

Career 
Alexis posts videos of her foraging finds on social media accounts. Her videos are informal, playful, and humorous, despite a long experience and encyclopedic knowledge of foraging. Since 2019, she has maintained the Instagram account "blackforager", and created the TikTok page "alexisnikole" in 2020. Nelson's posts concern such topics as the indigenous roots of foraging in America, the history of American foraging laws, and sustainable ways for her viewers to include wild plants and mushrooms in their diets, with a focus on vegan recipes. In most of her videos, she documents ingredients that she finds in the wild and then turns them into dishes using her own or adapted recipes.

Her popularity grew in 2021, from under 500,000 TikTok followers early that year to 3.3 million by January 2022. Her efforts were successful enough that she left her office job in September 2021 to focus on her foraging work full-time. National media attention that year included New York Times and Bon Appétit articles, as well as segments on The Kelly Clarkson Show and The Drew Barrymore Show. She was also added to the Forbes 30 Under 30 list that year.

In April 2022, Alexis attended the 2022 TED conference in Vancouver, the first since the COVID-19 pandemic began. At the conference, she gave a TED Talk about her foraging work, and cooked sweet-and-salty seaweed chips using Vancouver-foraged bull kelp. In June 2022, she won the James Beard Award for social media influence. Her accounts at the time had a cumulative 4.8 million followers.

Nelson is currently working on a cookbook, to be published by Simon & Schuster in 2023.

Influences 
Nelson attributes her interest in foraging to both natural inclination and her family's African and indigenous heritage.

Personal life 
Nelson lives in Columbus, Ohio, with a partner and several pets. She practices a vegan diet.

See also 
Ethnobotany
Notable Cape Verdean Americans

References

External links 

1992 births
21st-century American women
African-American chefs
American Internet celebrities
American TikTokers
Environmental scientists
Living people
Naturalists
Ohio State University alumni
People from Cincinnati
People from Columbus, Ohio
Social media influencers
Chefs of vegan cuisine